The 1982 Paris–Nice was the 40th edition of the Paris–Nice cycle race and was held from 11 March to 18 March 1982. The race started in Luingne and finished at the Col d'Èze. The race was won by Sean Kelly of the Sem–France Loire team.

Route

General classification

References

Further reading

1982
1982 in road cycling
1982 in French sport
March 1982 sports events in Europe
1982 Super Prestige Pernod